Stone Row is a historic building located at St. Charles, St. Charles County, Missouri. It consists of two 2 1/2-story stone buildings built about 1815 that were once separated by a 20-foot space.  About 1860, the space was filled by a 2 1/2-story brick structure.  Stone Row dates to the earliest settlement of St. Charles.  They were built for commercial and residential purposes.

It was added to the National Register of Historic Places in 1969.

References

Buildings and structures on the National Register of Historic Places in Missouri
Buildings and structures completed in 1815
Buildings and structures in St. Charles County, Missouri
National Register of Historic Places in St. Charles County, Missouri